Gosforth is a civil parish in the Borough of Copeland, Cumbria, England.  It contains 18 buildings that are recorded in the National Heritage List for England.  Of these, one is listed at Grade I, the highest of the three grades, three are at Grade II*, the middle grade, and the others are at Grade II, the lowest grade.  The parish contains the village of Gosforth and the surrounding countryside.  The listed buildings include houses and associated structures, farmhouses, farm buildings, a church and structures in the churchyard, a boundary stone, and a milestone.

Key

Buildings

References

Citations

Sources

Lists of listed buildings in Cumbria
Listed buildings